Surface roughness can be regarded as the quality of a surface of not being smooth and it is hence linked to human (haptic) perception of the surface texture. From a mathematical perspective it is related to the spatial variability structure of surfaces, and inherently it is a multiscale property. It has different interpretations and definitions depending from the disciplines considered.

In surface metrology 
Surface roughness, often shortened to roughness, is a component of surface finish (surface texture). It is quantified by the deviations in the direction of the normal vector of a real surface from its ideal form. If these deviations are large, the surface is rough; if they are small, the surface is smooth. In surface metrology, roughness is typically considered to be the high-frequency, short-wavelength component of a measured surface. However, in practice it is often necessary to know both the amplitude and frequency to ensure that a surface is fit for a purpose.

Roughness plays an important role in determining how a real object will interact with its environment. In tribology, rough surfaces usually wear more quickly and have higher friction coefficients than smooth surfaces. Roughness is often a good predictor of the performance of a mechanical component, since irregularities on the surface may form nucleation sites for cracks or corrosion. On the other hand, roughness may promote adhesion. Generally speaking, rather than scale specific descriptors, cross-scale descriptors such as surface fractality provide more meaningful predictions of mechanical interactions at surfaces including contact stiffness and static friction.

Although a high roughness value is often undesirable, it can be difficult and expensive to control in manufacturing. For example, it is difficult and expensive to control surface roughness of fused deposition modelling (FDM) manufactured parts. Decreasing the roughness of a surface usually increases its manufacturing cost. This often results in a trade-off between the manufacturing cost of a component and its performance in application.

Roughness can be measured by manual comparison against a "surface roughness comparator" (a sample of known surface roughness), but more generally a surface profile measurement is made with a profilometer. These can be of the contact variety (typically a diamond stylus) or optical (e.g.: a white light interferometer or laser scanning confocal microscope).

However, controlled roughness can often be desirable. For example, a gloss surface can be too shiny to the eye and too slippery to the finger (a touchpad is a good example) so a controlled roughness is required. This is a case where both amplitude and frequency are very important.

Parameters 
A roughness value can either be calculated on a profile (line) or on a surface (area). The profile roughness parameter (...) are more common. The area roughness parameters (...) give more significant values.

Profile roughness parameters 
 The profile roughness parameters are included in BS EN ISO 4287:2000 British standard, identical with the ISO 4287:1997 standard. The standard is based on the  ″M″ (mean line) system.
There are many different roughness parameters in use, but  is by far the most common, though this is often for historical reasons and not for particular merit, as the early roughness meters could only measure . Some parameters are used only in certain industries or within certain countries. For example, the  family of parameters is used mainly for cylinder bore linings, and the Motif parameters are used primarily in the French automotive industry. The MOTIF method provides a graphical evaluation of a surface profile without filtering waviness from roughness. A motif consists of the portion of a profile between two peaks and the final combinations of these motifs eliminate ″insignificant″ peaks and retains ″significant″ ones. Please note that  is a dimensional unit that can be micrometer or microinch.

Since these parameters reduce all of the information in a profile to a single number, great care must be taken in applying and interpreting them. Small changes in how the raw profile data is filtered, how the mean line is calculated, and the physics of the measurement can greatly affect the calculated parameter. With modern digital equipment, the scan can be evaluated to make sure there are no obvious glitches that skew the values.

Because it may not be obvious to many users what each of the measurements really mean, a simulation tool allows a user to adjust key parameters, visualizing how surfaces which are obviously different to the human eye are differentiated by the measurements. For example,  fails to distinguish between two surfaces where one is composed of peaks on an otherwise smooth surface and the other is composed of troughs of the same amplitude. Such tools can be found in app format.

By convention every 2D roughness parameter is a capital  followed by additional characters in the subscript. The subscript identifies the formula that was used, and the  means that the formula was applied to a 2D roughness profile. Different capital letters imply that the formula was applied to a different profile.

Each of the formulas listed in the tables assume that the roughness profile has been filtered from the raw profile data and the mean line has been calculated. Height is assumed to be positive in the up direction, away from the bulk material.

Amplitude parameters 
Amplitude parameters characterize the surface based on the vertical deviations of the roughness profile from the mean line. Many of them are closely related to the parameters found in statistics for characterizing population samples.

The arithmetic average roughness, is the most widely used one-dimensional roughness parameter.

Here is a common conversion table with also roughness grade numbers:

Slope, spacing and counting parameters 
Slope parameters describe characteristics of the slope of the roughness profile. Spacing and counting parameters describe how often the profile crosses certain thresholds. These parameters are often used to describe repetitive roughness profiles, such as those produced by turning on a lathe.

Other "frequency" parameters are Sm, a and q. Sm is the mean spacing between peaks. Just as with real mountains it is important to define a "peak". For Sm the surface must have dipped below the mean surface before rising again to a new peak. The average wavelength a and the root mean square wavelength q are derived from a. When trying to understand a surface that depends on both amplitude and frequency it is not obvious which pair of metrics optimally describes the balance, so a statistical analysis of pairs of measurements can be performed (e.g.: Rz and a or Ra and Sm) to find the strongest correlation.

Common conversions:

Bearing ratio curve parameters 
These parameters are based on the bearing ratio curve (also known as the Abbott-Firestone curve.) This includes the Rk family of parameters.

Fractal theory 
The mathematician Benoît Mandelbrot has pointed out the connection between surface roughness and fractal dimension. The description provided by a fractal at the microroughness level may allow the control of the material properties and the type of the occurring chip formation. But fractals cannot provide a full-scale representation of a typical machined surface affected by tool feed marks; it ignores the geometry of the cutting edge. (J. Paulo Davim, 2010, op.cit.). Fractal descriptors of surfaces have an important role to play in correlating physical surface properties with surface structure. Across multiple fields, connecting physical, electrical and mechanical behavior with conventional surface descriptors of roughness or slope has been challenging. By employing measures of surface fractality together with measures of roughness or surface shape, certain interfacial phenomena including contact mechanics, friction and electrical contact resistance, can be better interpreted with respect to surface structure.

Areal roughness parameters 

Areal roughness parameters are defined in the ISO 25178 series. The resulting values are Sa, Sq, Sz,... Many optical measurement instruments are able to measure the surface roughness over an area. Area measurements are also possible with contact measurement systems. Multiple, closely spaced 2D scans are taken of the target area. These are then digitally stitched together using relevant software, resulting in a 3D image and accompanying areal roughness parameters.

Practical effects
Surface structure plays a key role in governing contact mechanics, that is to say the mechanical behavior exhibited at an interface between two solid objects as they approach each other and transition from conditions of non-contact to full contact. In particular, normal contact stiffness is governed predominantly by asperity structures (roughness, surface slope and fractality) and material properties.

In terms of engineering surfaces, roughness is considered to be detrimental to part performance. As a consequence, most manufacturing prints establish an upper limit on roughness, but not a lower limit. An exception is in cylinder bores where oil is retained in the surface profile and a minimum roughness is required.

Surface structure is often closely related to the friction and wear properties of a surface. A surface with a higher fractal dimension, large  value, or a positive , will usually have somewhat higher friction and wear quickly. The peaks in the roughness profile are not always the points of contact. The form and waviness (i.e. both amplitude and frequency) must also be considered.

In Earth Sciences 
In Earth Sciences (e.g., Shepard et al., 2001; Smith, 2014) and Ecology (e.g., Riley et al., 1999; Sappington et al., 2007) surface roughness has a quite broad meaning (e.g. Smith, 2014), with multiple definitions, and generally it is considered a multi-scale property related to surface spatial variability; it is often referred as surface texture (e.g., Trevisani et al., 2012), given the evident analogies to image texture (e.g., Haralick et al. 1973; Lucieer and Stein, 2005)  when the analysis is performed on digital elevation models. From this perspective there are various interlinks with methodologies related to geostatistics (e.g., Herzfeld and Higginson, 1996), fractal analysis (e.g. Bez and Bertrand, 2011) and pattern recognition (e.g., Ojala et al. 2002), including many interrelations with remote sensing approaches. In the context of geomorphometry (or just morphometry, Pike, 2000) the applications cover many research topics in applied and environmental geology, geomorphology, geostructural studies and soil science (e.g., Cavalli and Marchi 2008; Dusséaux and Vannier, 2022; Evans et al., 2022; Frankel and Dolan 2007; Glenn et al. 2006; Grohmann et al., 2011; Guth, 1999; Lindsay, 2019; Misiuk et al., 2021; Pollyea and Fairley, 2011, Trevisani and Rocca, 2015; Trevisani et al. 2023; Woodcock, 1977).

Soil-surface roughness 
Soil-surface roughness (SSR) refers to the vertical variations present in the micro- and macro-relief of a soil surface, as well as their stochastic distribution.  There are four distinct classes of SSR, each one of them representing a characteristic vertical length scale; the first class includes microrelief variations from individual soil grains to aggregates on the order of 0.053–2.0 mm; the second class consists of variations due to soil clods ranging between 2 and 100 mm; the third class of soil surface roughness is systematic elevation differences due to tillage, referred to as oriented roughness (OR), ranging between 100 and 300 mm;  the fourth class includes planar curvature, or macro-scale topographic features.

The two first classes account for the so-called microroughness, which has been shown to be largely influenced on an event and seasonal timescale by rainfall and tillage, respectively.  Microroughness is most commonly quantified by means of the Random Roughness, which is essentially the standard deviation of bed surface elevation data around the mean elevation, after correction for slope using the best-fit plane and removal of tillage effects in the individual height readings.  Rainfall impact can lead to either a decay or increase in microroughnesss, depending upon initial microroughness conditions and soil properties.  On rough soil surfaces, the action of rainsplash detachment tends to smoothen the edges of soil surface roughness, leading to an overall decrease in RR.  However, a recent study which examined the response of smooth soil surfaces on rainfall showed that RR can considerably increase for low initial microroughness length scales in the order of 0 – 5 mm.  It was also shown that the increase or decrease is consistent among various SSR indices.

See also
 Discontinuity (Geotechnical engineering)
 Rugosity
 Normal contact stiffness
 Surface finish
 Surface metrology
 Surface roughness measurement ISO 25178
 Waviness
 Asperity (materials science)

References

External links

 Surface Metrology Guide
 Roughness terminology 
 Ra and Rz description
 Surface Roughness (Finish) Review and Equations
 SPE (Surface Profile Explorer)
Online calculator to convert roughness parameters Ra and Rz
 Enache, Ştefănuţă, La qualité des surfaces usinées (Transl.: Quality of machined surfaces).Dunod, Paris, 1972, 343 pp.
 Husu, A.P., Vitenberg, Iu., R., Palmov, V. A., Sherohovatost poverhnostei (Teoretiko-veroiatnostnii podhod) (Transl.: Surface roughness (theoretical-probabilistic approach)), Izdatelstvo "Nauka", Moskva, 1975, 342 pp.
 Davim, J. Paulo, Surface Integrity in Machining, Springer-Verlag London Limited 2010, 
 Whitehouse, D. Handbook of Surface Metrology, Institute of Physics Publishing for Rank Taylor-Hobson Co., Bristol 1996
 Geostatistical-based tools for surface roughness or image texture analysis:https://doi.org/10.5281/zenodo.7132160

Tribology
Metalworking terminology
Mechanical engineering